Edward H Sutton (born 1948) is a former English badminton international player and a former national champion.

Biography
Sutton became the English National doubles champion after winning the English National Badminton Championships in 1975 with David Eddy. Sutton played for Staffordshire and England and was also won the men's doubles title at the Denmark Open in 1975 and the Czechoslovakian International in 1978.

He was a teacher by trade and married fellow badminton player Barbara Giles in 1977.

References 

English male badminton players
1948 births
Living people